Anthony David Stephen Smith (23 September 1939 – 19 July 2016) was a British historical sociologist who, at the time of his death, was Professor Emeritus of Nationalism and Ethnicity at the London School of Economics. He is considered one of the founders of the interdisciplinary field of nationalism studies.

Smith took his first degree in classics and philosophy at Oxford University and his master's degree and doctorate in sociology at the London School of Economics. He was the first president of the Association for the Study of Ethnicity and Nationalism.

Work 

Smith's best-known contributions to the field are the distinction between 'civic' and 'ethnic' types of nations and nationalism, and the idea that all nations have dominant 'ethnic cores'. While Smith agrees with other authors that nationalism is a modern phenomenon, he insists that nations have premodern origins.

He is a former student of the philosopher and anthropologist Ernest Gellner, but he did not share his view of nationalism in the long run. He created an approach of nationalism he called ethnosymbolism.  The Warwick Debate of October 24, 1995, held at Warwick University,  exemplified the positions of Smith and Gellner, and clarified the definitions they used.

Nationalism
Smith argues that nationalism draws on the pre-existing history of the "group", an attempt to fashion this history into a sense of common identity and shared history. That is not to say that this history should be academically valid or cogent, but Smith asserts that many nationalisms are based on historically flawed interpretations of past events and tend to mythologise small, inaccurate parts of their history. Moreover, Smith reasons that nationalistic interpretations of the past are frequently fabricated to justify modern political and ethnic positions.

Nationalism, according to Smith, does not require that members of a "nation" should all be alike, but only that they should feel an intense bond of solidarity to the nation and other members of their nation. A sense of nationalism can inhabit and be produced from whatever dominant ideology exists in a given locale. Nationalism builds on pre-existing kinship, religious, and belief systems. Smith describes the ethnic groups that form the background of modern nations as "ethnie".

Nations and nation-states
When speaking of nation-states Smith notes, "We may term a state a ‘nation-state’ only if and when a single ethnic and cultural population inhabits the boundaries of a state, and the boundaries of that state are coextensive with the boundaries of that ethnic and cultural population".

Smith defines nationalism as "an ideological movement for attaining and maintaining autonomy, unity and identity on behalf of a population deemed by some of its members to constitute an actual or potential 'nation'".

A nation, meanwhile, is "a named population sharing a historic territory, common myths and historical memories, a mass public culture, a common economy and common legal rights and duties for its members". Ethnies are, in turn, defined as "named units of population with common ancestry myths and historical memories, elements of shared culture, some link with a historic territory and some measure of solidarity, at least among their elites". The boundaries of an ethnie can be quite recognisable even when not all of its characteristics appear at the same time. It is, in other words, not a question of a smallest common denominator.

Smith states that even when nations are the product of modernity, it is possible to find ethnic elements that survive in modern nations. Ethnic groups are different from nations. Nations are the result of a triple revolution that begins with the development of capitalism and leads to a bureaucratic and cultural centralisation along with a loss of power by the Church. Smith, however, maintains that there are also many cases of ancient nations and so cannot be considered a modernist. He is often regarded as the 'founding father' of ethno-symbolism. Smith's ethno-symbolist approach has been critically examined by several modernist scholars.

Academic freedom

In 1987 Parliament proposed to subject the hitherto semi-autonomous British universities to much tighter state control. Concerned at the threat which this posed to individual academic freedom and to the independence of research and publication, Smith founded the Council for Academic Autonomy, and continued as its long-term Secretary. This scored an early success, arising from its petition to Parliament and its lobbying and representation in the House of Lords, in an amendment to the Education Reform Act 1988  guaranteeing freedom of expression and publication to academic staff in the older universities. The Council continued its interactions with Government  and its organisation of symposia on academic independence into the early years of the millennium. See also Fergus Millar and Conrad Russell, 5th Earl Russell.

Selected publications

References

Further reading

Maxwell, A. (2020). Primordialism for Scholars Who Ought to Know Better: Anthony D. Smith's Critique of Modernization Theory. Nationalities Papers, 48(5), 826–842. doi:10.1017/nps.2019.93

1939 births
2016 deaths
Alumni of the London School of Economics
Alumni of Wadham College, Oxford
Scholars of nationalism
British sociologists
Academics of the London School of Economics